The following outline is provided as a topical guide to transportation planning.

Transportation planning is the process of defining future policies, goals, investments, and spatial planning designs to prepare for future needs to move people and goods to destinations.

Context
Built environment
Urban planning
Land-use

Tools and inputs
3D city model
Accessibility (transport)
Benefit-cost ratio
City-building game
Generalised cost
Hierarchy of roads
Isochrone map
Land-use forecasting
Local transport plan
New Approach to Appraisal
Permeability (spatial and transport planning)
SmartCode
Traffic simulation
Transport economics
Transport engineering
Transport forecasting
Travel behavior
Trip generation
Trip distribution
Mode choice
Route assignment

Purpose and implementation
Automobile dependency
Bicycle poverty reduction
Bus lane
Curb extension
Cycling advocacy
Home zone / Play Street
Journey to work
Modal shift
Shared space
Street hierarchy
Student transport
Traffic flow
Urban resilience

Theories
Braess's paradox
Lewis-Mogridge position

Sustainable transport
Complete streets
Freeway removal
Green transport hierarchy
Road diet
Road expansion
Highway revolt
Transit-oriented development
Transit mall
Living street
Low emission zone
Clean Air Zone
Ultra Low Emission Zone
Zero-emission zone
Zürich model

Cycling infrastructure
Cycling infrastructure
Bike freeway
Cycle lane

Outcomes and impacts
Gridlock
Induced demand
Traffic congestion
Transit desert
Transport divide
Travel blending
Travel plan

Social
Active mobility
Health impact of light rail systems
Obesity and walking

Measurements of planning outcomes
Available seat miles
Crush load
Cycling mobility
Passenger load factor
Passengers per hour per direction
Patronage (transportation)
Public transport accessibility level
Route capacity
Units of transportation measurement
Walkability

Notable publications and government reports
The Death and Life of Great American Cities
Roads for Prosperity
Sustainable Development Goal 11
Traffic in Towns
A New Deal for Transport: Better for everyone

People
Siân Berry
Ernest Marples
Robert Moses
Sam Schwartz
Jarrett Walker
John Whitelegg
Christian Wolmar

Organizations
Automobile association
Motor club
Pedestrian's Association
Sustrans
Transport planning professional (UK)

See also
Outline of transport

Outlines of transport